Negera ramosa is a moth in the family Drepanidae. It was described by Watson in 1965. It is found in the Democratic Republic of Congo (Orientale) and Uganda.

References

Moths described in 1965
Drepaninae
Moths of Africa